Charles Philippe Dieussart (also Charles Philipp) (ca. 1625–1696) was a Dutch architect and sculptor, active in Germany in the second half of the seventeenth century. Most notably, he designed the Jagdschloss Glienicke, today a UNESCO World Heritage Site.

Life

Dieussart was descended from French Huguenots who had moved to the Dutch Republic and is thought to have been born in Rome. His brother was the sculptor Jean Baptiste Dieussart, who mainly worked in Sweden. In 1657, he entered the service of Duke Gustav Adolf of Mecklenburg-Güstrow. His first important commission, which remained among his most important contributions, was the Rossewitz Castle, the first Baroque building in Mecklenburg. Also, well-known is the tomb he designed for Günther von Passow in the Güstrow Cathedral.

He wrote the book Theatrum architecturae civilis  that was published in several editions (1679 and 1682 in Güstrow, 1692 and possibly also 1695 in Bayreuth), dedicated to various of his patrons, and for which the architect Leonhard Dientzenhofer commissioned a posthumous edition in Bamberg (with changed dedication and foreword) in 1697.

Notes

References

Year of birth missing
1620s births
Dutch Baroque sculptors
Dutch Baroque architects
1696 deaths